RNA (guanine-9-) methyltransferase domain containing 2 is a protein that in humans is encoded by the RG9MTD2 gene. The gene is also known as TRM10.

Model organisms

Model organisms have been used in the study of RG9MTD2 function. A conditional knockout mouse line, called Rg9mtd2tm1a(EUCOMM)Wtsi was generated as part of the International Knockout Mouse Consortium program — a high-throughput mutagenesis project to generate and distribute animal models of disease to interested scientists.

Male and female animals underwent a standardized phenotypic screen to determine the effects of deletion. Twenty one tests were carried out on homozygous mutant mice and one significant abnormality was observed: males had increased circulating magnesium levels.

References
 

Human proteins
Genes mutated in mice